Tynedale District Council elections were generally held every four years between the council's creation in 1974 and its abolition in 2009. Tynedale was a non-metropolitan district in Northumberland, England. The council was abolished and its functions transferred to Northumberland County Council with effect from 1 April 2009.

Political control
The first election to the council was held in 1973, initially operating as a shadow authority before coming into its powers on 1 April 1974. From 1973 until its abolition in 2009 political control of the council was held by the following parties:

Council elections
1973 Tynedale District Council election
1976 Tynedale District Council election (New ward boundaries)
1979 Tynedale District Council election
1983 Tynedale District Council election
1987 Tynedale District Council election (District boundary changes took place but the number of seats remained the same)
1991 Tynedale District Council election (District boundary changes took place but the number of seats remained the same)
1995 Tynedale District Council election (District boundary changes took place but the number of seats remained the same)
1999 Tynedale District Council election (New ward boundaries)
2003 Tynedale District Council election
2007 Tynedale District Council election

By-election results

References

 
Council elections in Northumberland
District council elections in England